Iolaus penningtoni, the Pennington's sapphire, is a butterfly in the family Lycaenidae. It is found in southern Zambia, Zimbabwe and Botswana. The habitat consists of savanna.

The larvae feed on the Helixanthera species H. kirkii and H. garciana. Young larvae feed on the flowers of their host plant. When mature, they may occasionally feed on the leaves as well. The larvae vary in colour from green to pinkish orange, depending on the colour of the flowers upon which they are feeding.

References

Butterflies described in 1959
Iolaus (butterfly)